Justin Ikeem Staples (born December 10, 1989) is an American football linebacker who is currently a free agent. He played college football for the University of Illinois. He has been a member of the Cleveland Browns and Tennessee Titans.

Early years
Staples played high school football at St. Edward High School in Lakewood, Ohio. He was named to the Cleveland Plain Dealer All-State team as a linebacker his senior year, recording 92 tackles, seven sacks, one interception, 11 pass break-ups, six forced fumbles and two recovered fumbles. He was also picked for the Big 33 Football Classic, which at the time featured the best Pennsylvania and Ohio seniors.

College career
Staples played for the Illinois Fighting Illini from 2009 to 2012. He was redshirted in 2008. He played 48 games as a defensive end for the Illini, recording 62 career tackles, 2.5 sacks, three forced fumbles and one fumble recovery. He is also a member of the Omega Psi Phi fraternity

Professional career
Staples was rated the 79th best defensive end in the 2013 NFL Draft by NFLDraftScout.com.

Cleveland Browns
Staples signed with the Cleveland Browns in April 2013 after going undrafted in the 2013 NFL draft. He was released by the Browns on August 31 and signed to the team's practice squad on September 25, 2013. He signed a futures contract with the Browns on December 30, 2103. He was released by the Browns on September 9, 2014.

Tennessee Titans
Staples was signed to the Tennessee Titans' practice squad on September 16, 2014. He was promoted to the active roster on November 20 and made his NFL debut on November 23, 2014 against the Philadelphia Eagles, recording one tackle. He was released by the Titans on September 6, 2015 and signed to the team's practice squad on September 8, 2015. Staples was promoted to the active roster on October 17, 2015.

On September 2, 2016, Staples was released by the Titans as part of final roster cuts and was signed to the practice squad the next day. He was promoted to the active roster on December 5, 2016.

On September 2, 2017, Staples was released by the Titans.

References

External links
College stats

Living people
1989 births
American football linebackers
American football defensive ends
African-American players of American football
St. Edward High School (Lakewood, Ohio) alumni
Illinois Fighting Illini football players
Cleveland Browns players
Tennessee Titans players
Players of American football from Ohio
Sportspeople from Lakewood, Ohio
21st-century African-American sportspeople
20th-century African-American people